Ponerorchis capitata (synonym Amitostigma capitatum) is a species of plant in the family Orchidaceae. It is endemic to China, known only from Sichuan and Hubei. It produces white flowers.

Taxonomy
The species was first described in 1936 by Tsin Tang and Fa Tsuan Wang, as Amitostigma capitatum. A molecular phylogenetic study in 2014 found that species of Amitostigma, Neottianthe and Ponerorchis were mixed together in a single clade, making none of the three genera monophyletic as then circumscribed. Amitostigma and Neottianthe were subsumed into Ponerorchis, with this species becoming Ponerorchis capitata.

References 

Endemic orchids of China
capitata
Endangered plants
Flora of Sichuan
Flora of Hubei
Plants described in 1936
Taxonomy articles created by Polbot
Taxobox binomials not recognized by IUCN